Kapka Pod Neboto is the sixth studio album by Macedonian  singer Karolina Gočeva released in North Macedonia on 29 November 2010 through Avalon Production. The Serbian language edition of the album, titled Kap Ispod Neba was released that same year in Serbia. The album was largely written and produced by Vesna Malinova, Maja Sar, Mahir Sarihodžić and Miroslav Kostadinov. Four singles were released to promote the album: "Kapka Pod Neboto", "Ne Se Vrakaš", "Kraj" featuring Serbian rapper Wikluh Sky, "Za Godina Dve".

Songs from the album have gained popularity among the Macedonian public and are currently incorporated in set list of her live performances.

Background
The album was mostly recorded in three locations: Long Play in Sarajevo, BMA in Skopje and Ku-Ku Band in Sofija. Musically, the album is a pop record that is in line with the sound Gočeva demonstrated in her previous releases.

Singles and promotion
The lead single of the album, titled "Kraj" featuring Serbian R&B and hip hop artist Wikluh Sky was released in May 2009; it gained high popularity on radio charts in The Republic of Macedonia. Gočeva also performed the single at the opening ceremony of Big Brother Serbia.

The second single off the album, "Za Godina, Dve", was released in December 2009; lyrically it is a power ballad about ending a relationship. The song became an instant radio hit in The Republic of Macedonia and was promoted on the Serbian TV show Sve Za Ljubav and on the semi-final of VIP Veliki Brat.

Track listing

References

External links
Playlist on Karolina's YouTube channel with all the songs from the album

2010 albums
Karolina Gočeva albums
Macedonian-language albums